The Women's points race competition at the 2017 World Championships was held on 16 April 2017.

Results
The race was started at 14:12.

References

Women's points race
UCI Track Cycling World Championships – Women's points race